Bosko at the Zoo is an American animated short film featuring Bosko. It is a Looney Tunes cartoon, released on January 9, 1932. Like most Looney Tunes of the time, it was directed by Hugh Harman. Frank Marsales was its musical director.

Plot

Home media
The cartoon is available on the DVD Uncensored Bosko: Volume 2.

References

External links
 
Bosko at the Zoo on YouTube (unrestored)

1932 films
1932 animated films
Films scored by Frank Marsales
Films directed by Hugh Harman
Bosko films
Looney Tunes shorts
Warner Bros. Cartoons animated short films
American black-and-white films
1930s Warner Bros. animated short films